A swordstaff is a Scandinavian polearm, used in the medieval ages. It is made by placing a blade at the end of a staff.

Evidence of the weapon in use at the Battle of Elfsborg (Alvesborg) 1502 is provided by Paul Dolnstein, a landsknecht mercenary who fought in the battle, who refers to the Swedes carrying "good pikes made from swords".  He also provides sketches of the weapon.

Although Dolstein believed the weapon was made from swords, there is no independent confirmation of this.

Origins 
The weapon has visual similarities to the partisan and Langue de boeuf and may share common origins.  However, Scandinavian Sagas make references to a number of pole weapons, usually translated as halberd or bill. These weapons are used to cut and to stab but their names suggest they were derived from the spear rather than a cutting weapon e.g. the Hewing Spear (höggspjót) and the atgeir. While clearly identifiable artistic or archaeological evidence of the form of these weapons is lacking, it is possible that the swordstaff may be a late derivative of this family of weapons.

Chinese swordstaff 

Chinese polearms that resembled swordstaves were also commonly used in ancient China from the late Warring States/Qin Dynasty to the Han Dynasty era. These were known as the pi (鈹), translated into English as either sword-staff or long lance, and a long bladed ranseur-like swordstaff weapon called the sha (鎩) with a blade that was around 62 cm long (up to 80 cm long) and a hilt that was ~19 cm long.

Notes

External links
 Meyers Großes Konversations-Lexikon - Schwertstab (in German)

Medieval polearms